The 2009 Catalan motorcycle Grand Prix was the sixth round of the 2009 Grand Prix motorcycle racing season. It took place on the weekend of 12–14 June 2009 at the Circuit de Catalunya. This race is known as one of the most thrilling in MotoGP history, because Valentino Rossi held off the challenge of teammate Jorge Lorenzo by overtaking him in the last corner, on the last lap, to win the race.

MotoGP classification

250 cc classification

125 cc classification

Incident
Julian Simon, a Spanish racer in the 125cc race, celebrated victory one lap early, as he was confused with the sign that his team had shown him. He thought the sign said he was first position with no laps left, when the sign actually says 'L1' which means that he had one lap remaining. Andrea Iannone stormed to the lead and won, whilst Simon could only finish fourth.

Championship standings after the race (MotoGP)
Below are the standings for the top five riders and constructors after round six has concluded.

Riders' Championship standings

Constructors' Championship standings

 Note: Only the top five positions are included for both sets of standings.

References

Catalan motorcycle Grand Prix
Catalan
Catalan Motorcycle Grand Prix
motorcycle